Nighat Dad (born ) is a Pakistani lawyer and Internet activist who runs the not-for-profit organisation Digital Rights Foundation. Her work in the field of IT security has earned her many international awards.

Early life and education
Dad was born in 1981 in Lahore. She hails from a village in Jhang, Punjab. She received her education from the University of the Punjab, Lahore from where she has received a degree of the Master of Laws. Her marriage lasted only 18 months, and as a single mother, she had to wage a legal battle to win the custody of her child. During court proceedings she met many single mothers involved in legal battle to gain custody of their children, and she has been helping such women.

Work
Dad is a lawyer by profession and practice criminal and family law.

In 2012, she set up the Digital Rights Foundation where she was executive director, educate Pakistani internet users, particularly women to protect themselves from online harassment. Pakistani activist for female education and the youngest-ever Nobel Prize laureate Malala Yousafzai has also attended workshops of Dad, before being shot by the Taliban in October 2012.

Dad led campaigns to protect online freedom of speech in Pakistan as well campaigns against legislation that gives the government broad powers of surveillance online, most notable one is the controversial Prevention of Electronic Crimes Bill 2015. She also contributed in the draft of Acid Prevention Law 2010 and the Domestic Violence Bill of Pakistan.

In 2015, she was named in the TIME magazine's list of Next Generation Leaders, for helping Pakistani women fight online harassment.

In 2016, she was awarded the Atlantic Council Digital Freedom Award and Dutch government's Human Rights Tulip award. She is also one of the 25 leading figures on the Information and Democracy Commission launched by Reporters Without Borders.

In November 2018 she joined The Tor Project's board of directors.

On 6 May 2020, Facebook appointed her to its content oversight board.

See also
 Internet censorship in Pakistan

References

External links 
 Digital Rights Foundation

1981 births
Living people
Pakistani lawyers
Pakistani activists
Pakistani women activists
Internet censorship in Pakistan
University of the Punjab alumni
People from Jhang District
Facebook Oversight Board members
20th-century Pakistani women
21st-century Pakistani women